Swiss may refer to:

 the adjectival form of Switzerland
Swiss people

Places
Swiss, Missouri
Swiss, North Carolina
Swiss, West Virginia
Swiss, Wisconsin

Other uses
Swiss-system tournament, in various games and sports
Swiss International Air Lines
Swiss Global Air Lines, a subsidiary
Swissair, former national air line of Switzerland
.swiss alternative TLD for Switzerland

See also
Swiss made, label for Swiss products
Swiss cheese (disambiguation)
Switzerland (disambiguation)
Languages of Switzerland, none of which are called "Swiss"
International Typographic Style, also known as Swiss Style, in graphic design
Schweizer (disambiguation), meaning Swiss in German
Schweitzer, a family name meaning Swiss in German
Swisse, an Australian vitamin company

Language and nationality disambiguation pages